Charles Franklin Wellford is an American criminologist, emeritus professor in the Department of Criminology and Criminal Justice at the University of Maryland–College Park. He previously served as the department's chair. In 1996, the Department of Criminology and Criminal Justice there established the Charles Wellford Fellowship in his honor. Since 1995, he has been the chair of the University of Maryland's Athletic Council. He was the president of the American Society of Criminology (ASC) during 1995-96.

Education
Wellford received his bachelor's degree from the University of Maryland in 1961, where he received his master's degree in 1963. In 1969, he received his Ph.D. from the University of Pennsylvania.

Career 
Wellford is known for research on variations in the clearance rate of homicides throughout the United States. For example, a 2001 study he authored concluded that the probability of a killing being solved by law enforcement was higher if a detective arrived at the scene within 30 minutes and quickly looked for witnesses.

Honors and awards
Wellford was elected as a fellow of the American Society of Criminology in 1996. In 2011, he received the University of Maryland President's Medal.

References

External links
Faculty profile

Living people
American criminologists
University of Maryland, College Park faculty
Presidents of the American Society of Criminology
University of Maryland, College Park alumni
University of Pennsylvania alumni
Florida State University faculty
Year of birth missing (living people)